Mythimna conigera, the brown-line bright-eye, is a moth of the family Noctuidae.

Distribution
This species can be found in Europe and there is a disjunct population in the Sind Valley, Kashmir named subspecies angulifera (Moore, 1881) and east across the Palearctic from Asia Minor, Armenia, Central Asia, Siberia to Japan.

Habitat
These moths inhabit open habitats, wet and dry meadows, in montane and subalpine areas.

Technical description and variation

The wingspan is 30–35 mm.  Forewing smooth pale ochreous suffused with brown except along costa; Forewing pale fulvous suffused with darker: lines fine, brown; inner line angled on submedian fold: outer sinuate, nearly parallel to outer margin; orbicular and reniform stigmata pale, indistinct, except lower lobe of reniform, which is marked by a snowwhite spot, and is often surrounded by a grey cloud: hindwing pale rufous, darker towards termen: -suffusa Tutt is a melanic form, without any yellow tint, from North England and W. Ireland.

Larva dull yellow brown; dorsal line white, with dark edges: subdorsal line black; lateral lines white flecked with red, with a broad brown stripe running beneath them and above the black spiracles.

Biology
The moth flies from June to July depending on the location.  The larvae feed on various grasses, including Dactylis glomerata, Elymus repens. Phalaris arundinacea, Calamagrostis purpurea and Festuca species.

References

External links
 Lepiforum 
 Paolo Mazzei, Daniel Morel, Raniero Panfili Moths and Butterflies of Europe and North Africa
 Naturhistoriska risksmuseet 

Mythimna (moth)
Moths of Asia
Moths of Europe
Moths described in 1775